Lieutenant General Joseph K. Bratton (April 4, 1926 – June 2, 2007) was an American Army officer and nuclear engineer.

Biography
Bratton was born in St. Paul, Minnesota. He graduated third in the class of 1948 at the United States Military Academy and was commissioned in the Corps of Engineers. He served with an engineer battalion in Austria from 1949 to 1952 and with the divisional 13th Engineer Combat Battalion in Korea in 1953 and 1954, both before and after the armistice there. Likewise, he later commanded the 24th Engineer Battalion, 4th Armored Division, in Germany (1964–65) and the 159th Engineer Group in Vietnam (1969–70). Bratton also held numerous staff assignments. He was a military assistant to Secretary of the Army Stanley Resor from 1967 to 1969 and secretary to the Joint Chiefs of Staff from 1970 to 1972. Having received a master's degree in nuclear engineering from the Massachusetts Institute of Technology in 1959, Bratton served as Chief of Nuclear Activities, Supreme Headquarters, Allied Powers, Europe (SHAPE), from 1972 to 1975 and Director of Military Applications at the U.S. Department of Energy from 1975 to 1979. Note -  the U.S. Department of Energy was called the "United States Energy Research and Development Administration" at this time,  not the current name of Department of Energy (DOE).  His last assignments before becoming Chief of Engineers in October 1980 were as Division Engineer of the Corps' South Atlantic Division (1979–80) and then briefly as Deputy Chief of Engineers.

Bratton died on June 2, 2007, of an aneurysm, at the age of 81 in Virginia. His wife had preceded him in death in 2006. He, alongside his wife, are interred in Arlington National Cemetery in Arlington, Virginia.

Awards and decorations
His military awards included;

References

This article contains public domain text from 

1926 births
2007 deaths
People from Saint Paul, Minnesota
American nuclear engineers
United States Army generals
United States Army personnel of the Korean War
United States Army personnel of the Vietnam War
Recipients of the Legion of Merit
United States Military Academy alumni
American military engineers
Burials at Arlington National Cemetery
United States Army Corps of Engineers personnel
Recipients of the Defense Distinguished Service Medal
20th-century American engineers
Military personnel from Minnesota